The Edwin H. Armstrong House, in Yonkers in Westchester County, New York, is unusual for having achieved listing on the National Register of Historic Places and even designation as a National Historic Landmark, only to be demolished.  Its subsequent removal from National Historic Landmark status is the only such occurrence for a New York State site.

It was the home of Edwin H. Armstrong, inventor of two circuits that are the basis of modern telecommunication systems, and also inventor of wide-band frequency modulation (FM) radio.

The home, a Queen Anne house, was located at 1032 Warburton Avenue in Yonkers.

It was designated a National Historic Landmark on January 7, 1976. It was demolished in 1983 after suffering fire damage. It was subsequently de-designated as a National Historic Landmark and delisted from the National Register of Historic Places in 1986.

References

Armstrong House
Armstrong House
Armstrong House
Armstrong House
Armstrong House
Armstrong House
Armstrong House
Queen Anne architecture in New York (state)
Buildings and structures demolished in 1983